The Alvis TB 14 was a British two seater open car produced by Alvis cars based on the running gear of the TA 14 saloon and made only in 1950.

Alvis contracted AP Metalcraft, a Coventry coachbuilder, to produce the two door open car body to fit on the TA 14 chassis. The car had heavily cut away door tops on the rear hinged doors and very long sweeping front wings and a fold down windscreen. The radiator grille was a controversial item being pear shaped with the bottom side bulges concealing the headlights which consequentially were a long way from the side of the car. The front sidelights were mounted in the bumpers. Both right and left hand drive versions were made.

The 1892 cc engine was slightly modified to produce ,  more than the saloon engine by fitting twin SU carburettors.  The TA 14 suspension was retained with its non-independent leaf springing all round. As the car was lighter than the TA 14 the final drive ratio was changed from 4.875:1 to 4.3:1 helping to increase the top speed and improving economy.

The car could reach  but its high price of £1,276 on the home market limited sales.

References

Further reading

 
 

TB 14
Cars introduced in 1950
Rear-wheel-drive vehicles